Adrenal gland disorders (or diseases) are conditions that interfere with the normal functioning of the adrenal glands. Adrenal disorders may cause hyperfunction or hypofunction, and may be congenital or acquired.

The adrenal gland produces hormones that affects growth, development and stress, and also helps to regulate kidney function. There are two parts of the adrenal glands, the adrenal cortex and the adrenal medulla. The adrenal cortex produces mineralocorticoids, which regulate salt and water balance within the body, glucocorticoids (including cortisol) which have a wide number of roles within the body, and androgens, hormones with testosterone-like function. The adrenal medulla produces epinephrine (adrenaline) and norepinephrine (noradrenaline). Disorders of the adrenal gland may affect the production of one or more of these hormones.

Tumors of the adrenal gland 
 Adrenal adenoma, a benign tumor of the adrenal gland which may result in overproduction of one or more adrenal hormones, or may be inactive
 Adrenocortical carcinoma, cancer of the adrenal cortex
 Adrenal incidentaloma, an adrenal tumor (of any type) discovered accidentally during a scan which performed for an unrelated reason
 Pheochromocytoma, a catecholamine-producing tumor of the adrenal medulla, which may or may not be cancerous

Hereditary disorders associated with adrenal tumors 
 Von Hippel–Lindau disease, a mutation of the VHL1 tumor-suppression gene associated with many types of tumor, including pheochromocytoma
 Multiple Endocrine Neoplasia, a family of syndromes in which genetic abnormalities contribute to the development of endocrine tumors

Notable people with adrenal gland disorders 
 John F. Kennedy, the 35th president of the United States was diagnosed with Addison’s disease.
 Some have suggested Jane Austen was an avant la lettre case of Addison's Disease, but others have disputed this.
 Scientist Eugene Merle Shoemaker, co-discoverer of the Comet Shoemaker-Levy 9 had Addison's Disease.

Disorders of hormone over/under-production 
 Addison's disease, also known as primary adrenal insufficiency, a disease in which the adrenal glands do not produce sufficient glucocorticoids (sometimes also mineralocorticoids) for a reason directly related to the adrenal gland itself, such as auto-immune damage to the adrenal gland or adrenal gland atrophy due to medication use
 Adrenal crisis, a life-threatening medical emergency resulting from insufficient levels of cortisol
 Adrenal insufficiency, a condition in which the adrenal glands do not produce sufficient glucocorticoids (or sometimes mineralocorticoids. This is often due to another adrenal disorder, such as Addison's Disease or Congenital Adrenal Hyperplasia, however it may also result from a problem elsewhere in the body (such as the hypothalamus or pituitary gland) that leads to abnormalities in the production of hormones regulating adrenal function
 Congenital Adrenal Hyperplasia, a hereditary disorder in which one of the enzymes involved in cortisol synthesis does not function properly. This disorder is also often associated with an over-production of androgen hormones.
 Cushing's disease, a disorder in which cortisol levels are abnormally high
 Hyperaldosteronism (including Conn's syndrome), a condition in which aldosterone is over-produced
 Hypoaldosteronism, a condition in which aldosterone is under-produced

References